José Díaz de Bedoya was member in Paraguayan Triumvirate following death of Francisco Solano López from November 1870 to 10 December 1870. He was Minister of Finance of Paraguay from 1869 to 1870.

References 

Finance Ministers of Paraguay
Paraguayan politicians
Paraguayan military personnel
Year of birth missing
Year of death missing